Harry Foster Welch (November 27, 1893 – August 16, 1973) was an American radio and voice actor, best known for providing the voice of Popeye in cartoons and portraying the character in live performances beginning in 1934.

References

1893 births
1973 deaths
American male voice actors
American male radio actors
20th-century American male actors
People from Annapolis, Maryland
People from Blowing Rock, North Carolina